Angel Carlos Ramírez Sánchez (born 7 July 1955) is a Cuban rower. He competed in the men's eight event at the 1976 Summer Olympics.

References

External links
 

1955 births
Living people
Cuban male rowers
Olympic rowers of Cuba
Rowers at the 1976 Summer Olympics
Place of birth missing (living people)
Rowers at the 1975 Pan American Games
Pan American Games medalists in rowing
Pan American Games silver medalists for Cuba
Medalists at the 1975 Pan American Games
20th-century Cuban people
21st-century Cuban people